The Communist Party of India (Marxist–Leninist) Liberation (abbreviated: CPI(ML) or CPI-ML or CPIML(L) or CPI-ML(L) or CPIML Liberation) also referred to as the Liberation Group, is a Communist political party in India.

History 
In 1973 the original Communist Party of India (Marxist–Leninist) split, with one group led by Sharma and another by Mahadev Mukherjee. Vinod Mishra initially belonged to Mukherjee's party, but he and the Burdwan Regional Committee broke with Mukherjee in September 1973. Mishra sought contact with the Sharma group, but the Burdwan Regional Committee was later divided and Mishra denounced the political line of Sharma (a critique, which amongst other things, called for the formation of open mass organizations, a move that almost constituted a heresy in the CPI (ML) movement at the time).

In 1974 Mishra came into contact with Subrata Dutta (Jauhar), a leader of armed struggle in the plain areas of Bihar. On 28 July 1974 (the second death anniversary of Charu Majumdar) a new party Central Committee was formed with Jauhar as General Secretary and Mishra and Swadesh Bhattacharya (Raghu) as members. The reorganized party became known as the 'anti-Lin Biao' group (whilst the faction of Mahadev Mukherjee constituted the 'pro-Lin Biao' group). The anti-Lin Biao group became known as the CPIML Liberation.

Mishra served as West Bengal secretary of the new party organization. Under Mishra's leadership new dalams (guerilla squads) were formed.

In November 1975 Jauhar was killed in the midst of Lal Sena activities. Mishra became the new party General Secretary in a reorganized five-member Central Committee. Mishra organized a second party congress, held clandestinely in the rural areas of Gaya district in February 1976. The congress unanimously re-elected Mishra as General Secretary.

Reorientation and rectification 
Mishra was the political architect of the process of re-orientation of CPIML Liberation. By 1976 the party had adopted a position that armed struggle would be combined with building a broad anti-Congress democratic front movement. The process further elaborated through an internal rectification process initiated in late 1977. Party study circles and party schools were started from central to block level of the party structure. The theory of two line tactics started to develop.

In 1981 party tried to unify the other splintered ML factions. The party organised a unity meet with 13 ML factions to form a unified leading core . But the initiative was a failure.

The IPF 
In the early 1980s CPIML Liberation began building an open non-party mass movement (in direct to the original policy of CPI (ML)), the Indian People's Front (founded in April 1982). Nagbhushan Patnaik became the president of IPF. The construction of IPF, through which the underground party could develop links to other democratic forces on the basis of a popular, democratic and patriotic programme, was based on interventions by Mishra. However although Mishra broke with the dogmas of the early CPI (ML), he never renounced Charu Majumdar's legacy.

In the third party congress it was decided that IPF will participate in parliamentary elections. In 1989 IPF's Rameshwar Prasad won the loksabha seat from Ara (Bhojpur). In 1990, IPF won 7 seats from Bihar Legislative Assembly. Special initiatives taken for restructuring the party and open up. IPF hold its first rally on 8 October 1990 in Delhi.

The ASDC 
In 1985, the party launched People's democratic Front (PDF)  in Karbi Anglong district of Assam which won a seat in state assembly. In 1987 PDF was transformed to Autonomous State Demand Committee (ASDC). A sustained mass movement by ASDC help it to sweep district council elections in 1989. In 1981, ASDC's Jayanta Rongpi became an MP in Parliament. In 1996, ASDC was able to send its five-member group in Assam assembly as MLA.

In 1992, after the Fifth party congress (Held in Kolkata), the party comes out in the open from its underground status. Mishra was re-elected General Secretary of the party at the sixth congress of CPIML Liberation in Varanasi in October 1997.

Present 

The Communist Party of India (Marxist–Leninist) (Liberation), led by Dipankar Bhattacharya is a surviving faction of the CPI (M-L). Liberation has established legal overground structures (trade unions, student groups, peasant organisations etc.) and participates in elections. In the Lok Sabha elections in 1999 the party won 0.3% of the votes and one seat (the former ASDC-seat from Assam). In the 2004 elections the seat was lost, mainly due to a split within ASDC. As of 2016, the party has been able to send its representatives to the state legislative assemblies of Bihar and Jharkhand as well as the panchayats of Bihar, Jharkhand, Uttar Pradesh, West Bengal, and Punjab.

In November 2020, it won 12 seats in Bihar's election.

Publications 

The English-language publication of the party is Liberation, and thus the party is called CPIML Liberation. Apart from Liberation, the party publishes a central Hindi weekly organ, Samkaleen Lokyuddh. Some state party committees publish their own organs, like the weekly Ajker Deshabrati in West Bengal, Nabasphulinga in Tripura, Teeppori in Tamil Nadu, Telugu Liberation in Andhra Pradesh, Kannada Liberation in Karnataka, Samkali Lok Morcha in Punjab, etc.

States

Bihar 
The party has a longstanding conflict with the feudal landlords since the beginning of CPI (ML). Siwan, Bhojpur, Arrah  are the strongholds of CPI (ML) movement. The communist movement in Bihar was founded by the comrade Jagdish Mahto, Rameshwar Ahir and Ramnaresh Ram in the Ekwaari village of Bhojpur.

Bihar Legislative Assembly Election 
2015

CPIML Liberation emerged as the third largest party in Bihar Legislative Assembly Election 2015. The party contested jointly along with CPI, CPI(M), RSP, Forward block, and SUCI(C) as a third alternative to the National Democratic Alliance and the Mahagathbandhan of Lalu Prasad Yadav and Nitish Kumar. The party won the seats of Darauli, Balrampur and Tarari) each. The party has a vote  percentage of 1.5% in the state. All the left parties together have a vote percentage of 3.59%.

2020

CPI(ML) Liberation contested the 2020 Bihar Legislative Assembly election as part of the Mahagathbandhan, an alliance of the UPA and the leftist parties led by the Rashtriya Janata Dal. The party secured 12 seats with a vote percentage of 3.16%, making it the fifth largest party in the Bihar Legislative Assembly. However, the Mahagathbandhan lost the election to the rival National Democratic Alliance.

As a result of the election, the CPI(ML)L was recognised as a state party by the Election Commission of India.

Jharkhand 
Since the separation of Jharkhand from Bihar important places like Ranchi, Dhanbad, Giridih, Koderma, Jamtada and others have been field of work of the party. In Jharkhand the party is the representative of regional adivasis who have conflicts with corporates and government against improper land seizure without proper rehabilitation. The party also has conflicts with the local coal mafias.

2014 state election
The party contested in cooperation with state left parties like  Marxist Coordination Centre(MCC),  CPI, and CPI(M) as an alternative to the BJP and INC led alliances. The party won the Dhanwar seat.

The party got 1.5% of vote in the state. All the left parties together got 2.5% vote in the state.

2019 state election
The party gained the legislative assembly seat of Bagodar but lost the previous seat from Dhanwar.

Leadership 

The current general secretary of CPIML Liberation is Dipankar Bhattacharya. The 10th party congress of CPIML Liberation, held in Mansa, Punjab, 28 th March 2018 elected a Central Committee with 77 members. The Central Committee later elected a 17 numbers of Politburo members Committee.

Politburo members

General Secretary

Mass organizations
The main mass organizations of the party are:
Revolutionary Youth Association (RYA)
All India Students Association (AISA)
All India Agricultural and Rural Labour Association (AIARLA)
All India Peasants' Coordination Committee
All India Central Council of Trade Unions (AICCTU)
All India Progressive Women's Association (AIPWA)
Autonomous State Demand Committee (ASDC)
All India Kisan Mahasabha (AIKM)

References

External links
Constitution of the Party, retrieved at Election Commission of India website
"The Naxalite Movement in Central Bihar" PDF document. By Bela Bhatia. Economic and Political Weekly.  9 April 2005 pp 1536 – 1549.